Penstemon pahutensis is a species of penstemon known by the common name Pahute Mesa beardtongue, or simply Pahute beardtongue. It is native to the desert hills and mountains of southern Nevada, including the Pahute Mesa for which it is named. It can also be found in a few areas over the border in California. The inside of the wide mouth of the flower is lined with white or yellow hairs, and the staminode is coated in yellow hairs.

References

External links
Jepson Manual Treatment
Nevada Natural Heritage Program Rare Plant Fact Sheet

pahutensis
Flora of California
Flora of Nevada
Flora without expected TNC conservation status